Joey Scarallo (born 29 November 1978 in Adelaide, Australia) is a professional racing driver. At the age of three his family moved to Long Island, New York, where he currently still lives.

Scarallo started karting at age 11, winning multiple championships. It was around this time that he graduated from the Jim Hall Kart School. When he was 13 years old, he was diagnosed with a brain tumor and had to put his racing aspirations on hold. After undergoing brain surgery he became a two-time national karting champion, winning two Duffy trophies, in the International Karting Federation (IKF.)

Open-wheel racing
After being emancipated as a minor, Scarallo started his car racing career in the open-wheel ranks in the US Formula Ford 2000 Championship Series in 1996. The first race was at the newly built Walt Disney World Speedway in a family owned 1995 Van Diemen. After a surprise outside pole qualifying position he led the first 9 laps of the race. Chris Economaki of Speed Sport News dubbed Scarallo the next Jeff Gordon.

Scarallo ran in the USFF2000 Series in 1996, a part of 1997, and in 1998. In 2000, he ran six races in the Toyota Atlantic Championship before making the jump to race in the Trans-Am Series in 2001. In 2007, he made the switch back to open wheel racing for one year, racing in the Indy Lights Series for a startup team.

Stock car racing 

It wasn't until 2002 that he joined the North American Trans-Am Championship. In February of that year, Scarallo was invited to drive for K&N Air Filters in a company development car, in the 24 Hours of Daytona. The car was an Ultima GTR. After breaking many times throughout the race, the car was finally retired during the night portion of the race. In 2004, Scarallo was hired to race in the 3-Hour Endurance race of Puerto Rico with teammate Jorge Diaz, another Trans-Am competitor. After qualifying on pole and leading every lap of the race Scarallo, became the very first American to win the event. 2005 was a very competitive year with many laps led, and a fifth place championship finish. The Trans-Am Championship went on hiatus after 2006 and Scarallo moved over to run in the SCCA World Challenge in the GT class with a Pontiac GTO.

In 2010, he made his NASCAR debut in the Nationwide Series when he was hired by a team to run on the Road America and Watkins Glen road courses helping them collect base prize money for qualifying and pulling out of the races early. Many lower budget NASCAR teams do this as a full-time revenue source, deriving the term "Start and Park".

Career results

Indy Lights

References

 SCCA Pro Series Profile
 Driver Database Profile
 Yahoo Nascar Profile
 Racing Reference Stats

1978 births
Atlantic Championship drivers
Australian expatriate sportspeople in the United States
Indy Lights drivers
Living people
NASCAR drivers
Sportspeople from Smithtown, New York
Racing drivers from South Australia
Trans-Am Series drivers
International Kart Federation drivers
U.S. F2000 National Championship drivers
Rahal Letterman Lanigan Racing drivers